Denis Jack Robert Parkinson (13 June 1915 – 16 March 2004) was an English Grand Prix motorcycle road racer  of the 1930s, 1940s and 1950s, and a founder member and President of the Wakefield and District Motor Sports Club, and won the 1947 Isle of Man TT Clubmans Junior TT on a 350cc Norton, and the 1953 Senior Manx Grand Prix.

Background
Denis Parkinson's birth was registered in Wakefield, West Riding of Yorkshire, and he died aged 88.

References

External links
Denis Parkinson (1915-2004) motor-cycling champion
Video "Isle Of Man 1946" at britishpathe.com
A blast from the past: MGP racing returns to the Mountain Course after World War II
Statistics at iomtt.com
Picture "Denis at Scarborough chasing rival Jack Brett" at iomtt.com
Denis Parkinson ~ Winner Senior Manx Grand Prix 1953 ~ Manx Norton (1993)
Denis Parkinson ~ Winner Senior Manx Grand Prix 1953 ~ Manx Norton (1993)
Photograph "Motorcycle Racer Denis Parkinson Senior TT Race"
Photograph "Motorcycle Racer Denis Parkinson In Action On His…"
Photograph "Denis Parkinson At Quarter Bridge During The 1953 Manx Grand Prix, The Last Of His Winning Rides" 
Photograph "Denis Parkinson, Winner Of The 1948 Junior Manx Grand Prix". Francis Beart (Tuner) Stands Behind
Photograph "1936 Junior And Lightweight Manx Grands Prix". Denis Parkinson (Excelsior Manxman) Is Congratulated Post-Race
Photograph "Denis Parkinson At Oliver's Mount"
Photograph "Denis Parkinson On A Lambretta At Oulton Park In 1953 "
Photograph "Denis Parkinson's 1953 Norton"
Photograph "Denis Parkinson's 1953 Norton"
'1949 Norton 490cc Model 30 International Clubman's TT Model Frame no. D11-21813 Engine no. D11-21813' at Bonhams
The Manx Norton ~ Denis Parkinson Chapter

1915 births
2004 deaths
English motorcycle racers
Isle of Man TT riders
Sportspeople from Wakefield
Place of death missing